Alverson is a surname. Notable people with the surname include:

Charles Alverson (1935–2020), American novelist, editor, and screenwriter
Rick Alverson (born 1971), American film director and screenwriter
Tommy Alverson, American singer-songwriter

See also
Alderson (surname)